The Manchester International Organ Competition was part of the biennial Manchester Festival. The Organ Competition ran from 1978 until 1986.

1978 - First competition
The First competition was held between 1 and 9 September 1978. The venues were Manchester Town Hall, Royal Northern College of Music, Manchester Cathedral, Birchfields, St. Ann's Church, St. Phillip's Church and Manchester University.
The artistic director was Geraint Jones.

First prize - John Scott
Second prize - Peter Sweeney

1980 - Second competition
The Second competition was held between 9 and 26 July 1980

First prize - 
Second prize - Thomas Trotter, Patricia Snyder (joint)

1982 - Third competition
The third competition was held 6–11 September 1982.

First prize - Michael Overbury
Second prize -

1984 - Fourth competition
First prize - John Keys
Second prize - Nick Murdoch

1986 - Fifth competition
First prize - Andrew Lumsden
Second prize - Giovanni Feltrin

After 1986 the Manchester International Festival continued biennially, but the organ competition was dropped.

References

Culture in Manchester
Music festivals in Greater Manchester
Pipe organ
Music competitions in the United Kingdom